Trimethoprim/sulfadoxine, sold under the brand name Trimidox, is an antibacterial agent that is used in cattle and swine to prevent and treat infections by both Gram-negative and Gram-positive bacteria.

Veterinary uses 
Trimethoprim/sulfadoxine is used in the treatment of swine and cattle; including dairy cattle, beef cattle and veal.

In cattle, it is used to treat:
 Respiratory tract infections such as, bovine pneumonia pasteurellosis (shipping fever)
 Alimentary tract infections such as salmonellosis and both enteric and septicaemic colibacillosis.
 Other infections such as pododermatitis (foot rot) and septicaemias.

In swine, it is used to treat:
 Respiratory tract infections such as, bacterial pneumonias.
 Alimentary tract infections such as, post-weaning scours and colibacillosis.
 Other infections such as bacterial arthritis and mastitis-metritis-agalactia syndrome in sows.

Contraindications 
Trimethoprim/sulfadoxine is contraindicated in cattle or swine that show marked liver parenchymal damage or blood dyscrasias, or those with a history of sulfonamide sensitivity.

Milk from an animal treated with trimethoprim/sulfadoxine must not be consumed for at least 96 hours following the most recent treatment; treated animals must not be slaughtered for use in food for at least ten days after the last treatment.

References 

Combination antibiotics
Veterinary drugs